Wellington Square may refer to:

 A neighbourhood in Burlington, Ontario, Canada
 Wellington Square, Chelsea, a garden square in Chelsea, London
 A square in Hastings, on the south coast of England
 A square in Kolkata, India, renamed Subodh Chandra Mallik Square
 Wellington Square, Los Angeles, in California, US
 Wellington Square, North Adelaide, South Australia
 Wellington Square, Oxford, England
 Wellington Square, Perth, in Western Australia